Hupan University (湖畔大学) is a corporate business school located in Yuhu Bay, Xihu (西湖) Hangzhou, Zhejiang Province, China. It was founded in 2015 by Jack Ma, founder of Alibaba Group, a multinational technology conglomerate.

This business school have 9 co-founders including Jack Ma, Chuanzhi Liu, Lun feng, Guangchang Guo, Yuzhu Shi, Guojun Shen, Yingyi Qian, Hongbing Cai and Xiaofeng Shao.

Hupan University is ranked 101-200th in WURI Global Top 100 Innovative Universities Ranking 2021.

History 
Jack Ma and nine fellow business executives decided to found a school based in China, during the 2015–16 Chinese stock market turbulence as China's answer to Harvard Business School, which itself was founded during the banking panic of 1907.

The institution also offers online classes.

Jack Ma stepped down from the Presidency of the university in 2021. The organization announced it would restructure, including changing its name to Hupan Innovation Center and disassociate itself from Ma.

Alumni 
 Justin Sun, cryptocurrency business owner
Tiger Hu, singer-songwriter and producer

References

External links 

Education in Hangzhou
Business schools in China
2015 establishments in China